Pottiales is an order of mosses in the subclass Dicranidae.

Classification

The following families are recognised in Bryophyte Biology:

Pottiaceae 
Pleurophascaceae 
Serpotortellaceae 
Mitteniaceae 

Some other families are recognised by other sources:

Ephemeraceae  – this putative family is characterized by highly simplified vegetative and sporogenous bodies and contains two genera, Ephemerum and Micromitrium. However, phylogenetic analysis finds it polyphyletic, with Ephemerum nested in Pottiaceae and Micromitrium recovered among the Dicranales, closely related to the Leucobryaceae, and assigned a new family, Micromitriaceae.
Hypodontiaceae  – family containing the genus Hypodontium. Alternatively placed in Dicranales
Splachnobryaceae  – containing the genera Splachnobryum and Koponobryum
Bryobartramiaceae  – family containing a single genus with one species, Bryobartramia novae-valesiae
Cinclidotaceae  (lattice mosses) – family containing the genus Cinclidotus. Alternately place in Pottiaceae.

References

 
Moss orders